TNSrecords (also known as TNS and That's Not Skanking) is a DIY Record Label based in Manchester, United Kingdom, founded in 2008 by Revenge of the Psychotronic Man bassist/vocalist Andy Psychotronic, along with a personal friend of his, Tim Bevington.  They specialise in Punk rock and Ska, though they also have included some Heavy metal acts. TNS produce a free Fanzine, arrange gigs in Manchester and run TNSradio, a podcast featuring music from their own and other, similar artists from around the world. They have organised showcase gigs in Leeds, Macclesfield, and Blackpool whilst being co-organisers of Manchester Punk Festival. They are sometimes referred to as TNS Records, but the correct name is TNSrecords.

Roster
The following all have releases on TNSrecords:
A WarAgainstSound
ACiD DROP
Autonomads
Beat The Red Light
Bethan Mary Leadley
Black Star Dub Collective
Bootscraper
BrainDead
Broken Aris (Sweden)
Faintest Idea
The Fractions
The Franceens
Fist Of The North Star (USA)
Hated Til Proven
Harijan
John Player Specials
The Kirkz
Kollapse (Denmark)
Leagues Apart
No Fealty (Denmark)
Nosebleed (band)
Officer Down
PIZZATRAMP (South Wales)
Revenge of the Psychotronic Man
Rising Strike
Sense of Urgency
The Shadowcops
Sounds of Swami
Stand Out Riot
Stoj Snak (Denmark)

Releases
To date, TNS Records have the following releases;
TNS001 Music By People Who Drink Cider In The Gutter, a 20 track compilation CD featuring UK based Punk Rock and Ska acts.
TNS002 Revenge of the Psychotronic Man v The Fractions, a split EP, featuring TNS Records' owner, Andy Psychotronic's own band, Revenge of the Psychotronic Man, and The Fractions.
TNS003 Harijan v The John Player Specials, a split EP, featuring Harijan, and The John Player Specials.
SUP001 Carnival Militia, a CD album by Stand Out Riot
TNS004 A Big Pot Of Hot, a CD album by The Shadowcops
SUP002 Quicker Than Khan CD album by The Emos
TNS005 Make Pigs Smoke, a CD album by Revenge of the Psychotronic Man
TNS006 Halcyon Days 7" EP by Sounds of Swami
TNS007 Mainstream Music Is Shit, a 37 track double compilation CD featuring UK based Punk Rock and Ska acts. - released August 2009
TNS008, a CD split EP, featuring Stand Out Riot, A War Against Sound, and Sense Of Urgency - released 6 December 2009
TNS009, Beat The Red Light, a CD EP, by Beat The Red Light
TNS010, Agroculture, a CD album by The Kirkz
TNS011, To Anywhere, a CD album by Leagues Apart
TNS012, Ignorance Is This, a CD album by Faintest Idea
TNS013, Country & Eastern, a CD album by Bootscraper
TNS014, Salt The Lands, a CD album by Beat The Red Light - 2011
TNS015, Gentleman Bandits, a CD album by Stand Out Riot - 2011
TNS016, Four Band Split, a CD split EP featuring Revenge of the Psychotronic Man, Mighty Midgets, Fist of the North Star and Broken Aris - 2011
TNS017, Bite The Hand That Feeds, a CD album by Rising Strike- 2011
TNS018, From Rusholme With Dub, a CD/LP split album by Autonomads and Black Star Dub Collective - April 2012
TNS019, Songs For The Short Of Attention, a CD album by Hated Til Proven - tbc, 2012
TNS020, TNSrecords vol.3 'These Troublesome Thinkers', a 42 track double compilation CD featuring UK based Punk Rock and Ska acts. - May 2012
TNS021, Dub Of Transgression, a 7" EP by BrainDead 2012
TNS022, S/T, a CD album by Bootscraper- 2012
TNS023, The Voice Of Treason, a CD album by Faintest Idea- 2012
TNS024/024v, Shattered Dreams Parkway, a 12" and CD album by Revenge of the Psychotronic Man (band) 2012
TNS025, Songs About Beliefs, a 7" EP by Stoj Snak 2012
TNS026, S/T, a 10" EP by Kollapse 2012
TNS027, S/T, a CD album by Sounds of Swami 2013
TNS028, The End Of Days,  a CD album by ACiD DROP 2013
TNS029, Libertalia,  a 12" album by BrainDead 2013
TNS030, In the Shadow of the Monolith,  a 12" album by No Fealty 2013
TNS031, In Session From Maida Vale,  a 7" EP by Revenge of the Psychotronic Man 2013
TNS032, Stepford Smiles,  a CD album by The Franceens 2013
TNS033, Nervous Racehorse,  a CD Album by Wonk Unit 2014
TNS034, Ten Years Of Revenge,  a 7" EP by Revenge of the Psychotronic Man 2014

TNSrecords Fanzine
TNSrecords also produce a fanzine which is free, and available at various music stores, and also on-line. The Fanzine features reviews of recent musical releases from the Punk rock, Ska, Hardcore, Psychobilly, and occasionally other genres, as well as articles, often of a comedy nature, and news about forthcoming gigs.
That's Not Skanking fanzine originally started in 2003, in Manchester. It covered punk rock, ska and related genres.
That incarnation of the fanzine lasted 18 issues, with an average run of 250 copies.
However, the launch of TNSrecords resulted in the fanzine being relaunched as TNSrecords fanzine. As of Summer 2011 there have been 14 issues, which usually coincided with label releases and have a print run of around 1500.
The fanzine also uses imagery of animals and has also featured comical features such as funny footballer names and human impressions of animals.
Content wise it varies from covering the ridiculous, through to more political and social issues. Band wise, as well as documenting the local scene and bands from the label, interviews have also been conducted with more established acts such as Zeke, Million Dead and many more.
The fanzine is currently featured in an exhibition at salford Art Gallery, curated by Salford Zine Library. The film features commentary by Andy.

TNS gigs
TNSrecords also arrange gigs. These usually feature bands that play Punk rock, Ska and other similar genres.  They are usually held at Retro Bar, Gulliver's, Kraak Gallery & Base Cafe in Manchester. But sometimes take place further afield, including Blackpool, Leeds, and Macclesfield.

In 2015 the first Manchester Punk Festival will be held jointly by TNSrecords, Moving North and Anarchistic Undertones.

TNSradio
In February 2009, TNSrecords launched TNSradio, a monthly podcast featuring Punk and Ska music. From February 2010 the podcast became a weekly show which is broadcast on American internet radio stations Punk Rock Demonstration. and Real Punk Radio. Due to a lack of time TNSrecords were unable to continue with the weekly show, with the episodes stopping in the summer of 2010. The show returned in June 2011, this time on a monthly basis, as part of the Punk Britannia weekly podcast which is broadcast on Punk Rock Demonstration and from the Studs and Punks website.

Other acts that have worked with TNS Records
Early in 2008 TNSrecords released a Compilation CD featuring UK Punk and Ska acts, under the title Music By People Who Drink Cider In The Gutter.  The CD received critical acclaim in the Manchester press as well as some note in the rest of the U.K. There has also been some notice taken of the Compilation CD Internationally. Tracks were included by various bands:
The Dangerfields
Revenge of the Psychotronic Man
The Kirkz
The Shadowcops
Buzzkill
Great St. Louis
Dog Toffee
Just Panic
Harijan
The Fractions
On The Turn
Speeding Bee
Faintest Idea
The Hyperjax
The Medicine Bow
Mr International and The Getawy Gang
Sounds of Swami
Death By Decibels
The Shuffle
Matt Woods

In the summer of 2009 TNSrecords released their second Compilation CD featuring UK Punk and Ska acts, under the title Mainstream Music Is Shit. Tracks were included by various bands including:
Disk 1
The Shadowcops
Sounds of Swami
Revenge of the Psychotronic Man
Rising Strike
D'Corner Bois
The Kirkz
The Emos
The Dangerfields
The Dead Reckoninc
The Hyperjax
Great St. Louis
The Nova Fives
ACiD DROP
Just Add Monsters
Fair Do's
The Dangerous Aces
The Terrors
SmackRats
2 Sick Monkeys

Disk 2
Harijan
Cartoon Violence
Stand Out Riot
John Player Specials
Jimmy The Squirrel
The Hostiles
The Hijacks
Sense of Urgency
A War Against Sound
Kickback UK
Faintest Idea
The Autonomads
Rasta4eyes
Just Panic
Los Salvadores
Bootscraper
The Medicine Bow

References

External links
Official site

British independent record labels
Punk record labels
Ska record labels
Record labels established in 2008